Desh Azad (2 February 1938 – 16 August 2013) was an Indian cricketer and cricket coach.

Cricket career
He played nineteen first-class cricket matches representing Haryana, Maharaja of Patiala's XI and Southern Punjab between 1953 and 1973 in which he scored 658 runs and took eight wickets. He also served as match referee in two Under-19 matches between India and Australia in 2005.

Coaching career
However, it was as coach that he was best known. India's 1983 World Cup winning captain Kapil Dev was the most famous of his students. The other cricketers he coached included Chetan Sharma who took the first hat-trick in Cricket World Cup history, Yograj Singh and Ashok Malhotra.

In 1986, he was honoured with the Dronacharya Award for his services to cricket coaching.

References

External links
 

1938 births
2013 deaths
Indian cricketers
Patiala cricketers
Southern Punjab cricketers
Haryana cricketers
Cricketers from Amritsar
Recipients of the Dronacharya Award